Helen Parr may refer to:

 Helen Parr (The Incredibles), a fictional character in the animated film The Incredibles
 Helena, Marchioness of Northampton  (1548/49–1635), Swedish-born noblewoman